La Trobe Financial is an Australian credit asset management firm specialising in asset management and credit. It offers real estate credit, investment account offerings and private wealth management.  The CEO is Mr. Chris Andrews. La Trobe Financial's head office is located in Melbourne, with corporate offices in Sydney, Shanghai and Hong Kong.

History

La Trobe Financial was established in 1952 in Australia and initially operated as a specialist residential lender and business partnership between Kel O’Mullane and Ray O’Neill. Attributed as one of the fastest growing permanent building societies in Victoria in the 1970s with a network of 9 branches and over 230 agents and AUM of $28 million. It was eventually de-mutualised after Ray O’Neill bought out his co-founding business partner in the early 1980s.

Between 1984 and 2022 Mr Greg O'Neill (OAM) operated and led the process of scaling and modernising the business.

La Trobe Financial specialise in originating, underwriting and managing granular assets of both traditional residential and commercial mortgage loans, cash, fixed interest and bonds.

La Trobe Financial fund these assets via institutional funding, a large Asset Management business and retail credit fund, and a global capital markets bond program.

Since establishment in 1952, the business has scaled to be one of the largest Australian non-bank institutions currently managing A$13.5 billion with more than 460 staff. During that time La Trobe Financial has assisted over 205,000 individuals, and have cumulatively managed investment funds from wholesale and retail sources in excess of A$36 billion; this has been carried out without loss to any institutional or pooled retail investor.

La Trobe Financial currently review A$10 billion of new investment grade asset investment opportunities annually.

Operations

The company operates through two core entities: La Trobe Financial Services an unlisted proprietary (private) company, holder of Australian Credit Licence "ACL" 392385, responsible for group credit asset administration and servicing, third party outsourcing services, custody services,  group insurance sales, and wholesale institutional funding mandates. The second core operational entity is La Trobe Financial Asset Management a public (unlisted) company and holder of Australian Financial Services Licence "AFSL" 222213, responsible for all retail and other investments in the La Trobe Australian Credit Fund and Asset Management operation.

Wealth & Asset Management

In 1989 the business commenced a pilot scheme of matching private investors with mortgages, and this idea as conceived by Greg O'Neill OAM (President & CEO) was an intentional pivot towards Asset Management to diversify revenue towards Fee Related Earnings (FRE), de-risk the business from single point funding dependencies, and to build a strategic moat from peers.

At $7.4billion in AUM covering some 75,000 Investors (15,000 from adviser platform) this has proved extraordinarily successful due to the sheer scale and critical mass the Asset Management arm now delivers.

Distribution

La Trobe Financial utilise over 3,500 independent finance brokers and 1,600 independent financial advisers as their third party product distribution across Australia, with full-time Business Development Managers (40) and an adviser support team (27).

In 1994 in recognition of its range of products the Housing Industry Association (HIA) appointed La Trobe Financial as exclusive financier for its national display village for two years, and La Trobe Financial opened its service desk seven (7) days a week.

Loan Products

Assets managed are Cash, Mortgage fixed interest Investments, and Bonds (residential mortgage backed securities). Current Assets Under Management at Feb 21 are 9% cash, 56% mortgages and 35% bonds. The mortgage book is composed of (15% - super prime residential mortgages), (23% - prime mortgage), (49% - near prime commercial and residential) and (9% - specialist residential mortgages); balance of 4% is cash. Products cater for a wide range of borrower and private wealth clients. The average group wide loan-to-valuation ration is a conservative 64.1%.

Asset Performance

La Trobe Financial performs in line with the broader market peers and its average per-loan loss experience is less than its peer group. It is a function of their conservative asset underwriting and 80% LVR maxima. Many traditional bank customers moved to La Trobe Financial as a result.

Funding Strategy

La Trobe Financial has perhaps the most diversified real estate credit lending program of all peers operating in Australia incorporating:
 A$3.6 billion of term debt facilities from local and international financiers;
 a A$7.4 billion Credit Fund featuring multiple investment account options including a 48-hour cash management account, a 90-day term account, 6 Month Notice Account, a 12 Month Term Account, 2 Year Account, a Peer to Peer (P2P) investment option, and a 4 Year (Bond Investment) account. The retail Credit Fund is independently rated; and
 a complementary A$3.8 billion publicly rated capital markets programme issuing Residential Mortgage Backed Securities (RMBS) globally.

La Trobe Financial first accessed debt capital markets in 2014 with the goal of broadening funding capabilities with an RMBS programme as one component of the Group's overall $6bn annual new term debt funding program.

The Global Financial Crisis (GFC)
In early 2007, La Trobe Financial employed over 120 staff and was originating around A$100m per month of residential and commercial mortgage business. The market for mortgage backed securities (RMBS) changed radically in July 2007, the start of the Credit Crunch. From this point onwards, risk aversion in the debt capital markets increased sharply, and the RMBS market effectively shut in early 2008. A large non-bank mortgage lender (RAMS) failed in August 2007, the first major casualty of the credit crunch in Australia's. The business had been listed on the ASX just 8 weeks earlier at a market capitalisation of A$880m.

The environment deteriorated again sharply in 2008 as the equity markets caught up with the scale of the turmoil in the structured credit markets, and started a major sell-off. Confidence in financial institutions of all types deteriorated throughout the year, and many banks struggled to fund themselves in the interbank markets, where borrowing rates rose sharply. Pressure built for financial institutions on multiple fronts, culminating in the failure of Lehman Brothers in September 2008. Governments in most developed countries implemented emergency support strategies designed to back-stop their struggling banks. In Australia, bank deposits were guaranteed in October 2008 and (A$20bn) mortgage backed bond purchase programme was introduced by the government via the AOFM. Government strategies were virtually all based on supporting their various regulated banking systems however, and non-bank lenders were largely left to fend for themselves.

Most non-bank lenders radically curtailed their lending as a result, or stopped completely. La Trobe Financial continued their operations unblemished throughout this period and all investors and borrowers funding and investment redemption needs respectively were met without compromise.

Strategic Partnerships 
On 22 December 2017, La Trobe Financial announced a strategic partnership with the sale of 80% of its operations to funds managed by Blackstone Group NYC
who have US$731 billion AUM. La Trobe Financial remains 100% privately owned company, by two shareholders 80% Blackstone and 20% by interests associated with CEO Mr. Greg O'Neill (OAM).

La Trobe Financial is overseen and governed by a majority independent board of directors meeting formally each quarter to review business activities. The board have delegated specific operational authority to various committees which have carriage for setting policy for management.

On 16 June 2022, Brookfield who have US$690 billion AUM purchased the business from Blackstone Group NYC and Greg O'Neill (OAM).

Philanthropy

La Trobe Financial’s philanthropic arm, the La Trobe Financial Foundation, has contributed more than $21.5million globally since establishment with its community ESG investment strategy. Recipients include the Australian Red Cross, the Salvation Army, the Epworth Hospital, Literacy for Women Campaign, Bell Shakespeare Company Sydney, UpHold & Recognize, and Lifeline Australia.

The La Trobe Financial Foundation is managed by Caterina Nesci (Director ESG and International Partnerships) who joined the business in 2010 having worked previously for international law firm Hogan Lovells in Hong Kong

Key dates and Milestones

Since 1952 operating institutional investment mandates sized between $100m to $800m. In 1990 introduced Australia's first alternative verification loan for self employed called Lite-Doc. In 2001 was appointed by the Australian Securities and Investments Commission ("ASIC") to take over another national operator.

More than $36 billion has been successfully invested and managed on behalf of institutional and retail investors since the company commenced its operations. Institutional portfolios comprise long term wholesale mandates from all of Australia's big four banks, most Australian regional banks, international banks and financial institutions without loss of mandated investor capital or interest since inception.

The group's Credit Fund accommodates both retail investors and select wholesale institutional investors; and operates under AFSL (222213) and the Corporations Act. The Credit Fund has over $6.1 billion (30 June 2021) of retail investments.

Previous chief executives

 Kelvin David O’Mullane 	1952–1972 (20 years) service 30 years
 Raymond Kevin O’Neill 	1972–1997 (25 years) service 45 years
 Gregory Kevin O’Neill OAM 	1997-2022(25 years) service 37 years

Previous chairman

 Mr Kelvin O'Mullane 	        1952–1961 (9 years)
 Mr Donald Cooper OA 	        1961–1972 (11 years)
 Mr Pat O'Brien 	        1972–1980 (8 years)
 Mr John Barton 1980–1984 (4 years)
 Mr John Dack DFC 1984–1986 (2 years)
 Mr Bertram Wilson 1986–1997 (11 years)
 Mr Raymond O'Neill 1997–2007 (10 years)
 Mr Perce Cooper 2007–2010 (3 years)
 Mr David Bird 2010–2015 (5 years)
 Mr John Marriott 2015-current (7 years)

References

Companies based in Melbourne
Financial services companies of Australia
Financial services companies established in 1952
The Blackstone Group companies
Australian companies established in 1952